Kenneth Francis McDowall (born 6 May 1938) is an English former footballer who played as an outside left in the Football League Fourth Division for Rochdale in the early 1960s. He began his career in the Cheshire League with Rhyl before joining Manchester United in September 1959. A year later, in October 1960, he left Manchester United for Rochdale without making an appearance.

External links

1938 births
Living people
Footballers from Manchester
English footballers
Association football forwards
Rhyl F.C. players
Manchester United F.C. players
Rochdale A.F.C. players
English Football League players